Akasegawa may refer to:

People
Genpei Akasegawa, Japanese artist

Other
7418 Akasegawa, main-belt asteroid

Japanese-language surnames